Slieve is an anglicisation of the Irish sliabh (mountain) in the names of various hills and mountains or ranges in the island of Ireland, including

 Slieve Anierin, County Leitrim
 Slieve Aughty, County Galway and County Clare 
 Slieve Bearnagh, County Down
 Slieve Binnian, County Down
 Slieve Bloom, County Laois and County Offaly
 Slieve Carr, County Mayo
 Slieve Coillte, County Wexford
 Slieve Commedagh, County Down
 Slieve Croob, County Down
 Slieve Donard, County Down
 Slieve Foy, County Louth
 Slieve Gallion, County Londonderry
 Slieve Gullion, County Armagh
 Slieve League, County Donegal
 Slieve Mish Mountains, County Kerry
 Slieve Miskish Mountains, County Cork
 Slieve na Calliagh, County Meath
 Slievenamon, County Tipperary 
 Slieve Rua, County Clare
 Slieve Rushen, County Cavan and County Fermanagh
 Slieve Snaght, County Donegal
 Slieve True, County Antrim

See also
 PS Slieve Bearnagh, a paddle steamer
 TSS Slieve Bloom, two twin-screwed steamers
 TSS Slieve Gallion, a twin-screwed steamer